The 2008–09 season was Wellington Phoenix's second season in the A-League.

Players

First-team squad

Transfers

In

Out

Matches

2008 Pre-Season Cup fixtures

Group B

2008-09 Hyundai A-League fixtures

Results by round

League table

Statistics

Appearances

Goal scorers

Goal assists

Discipline

Goal times

Home attendance

Club

Technical staff
First team Coach:  Ricki Herbert
Assistant coach:  Stu Jacobs
First team Physiotherapist:  Adam Crump
Masseur:  Dene Carroll
Strength & conditioning coach:  Ed Baranowski

Kit

|
|
|
|
|
|}

End of Season Awards
See also List of Wellington Phoenix FC End of Season Awards
Sony Player of the Year: Leo Bertos
Members’ Player of the Year: Ben Sigmund
Players’ Player of the Year: Shane Smeltz
Media Player of the Year: Shane Smeltz
Golden Boot: Shane Smeltz - 12 goals

References

External links

 Wellington Phoenix - Official Website

Wellington Phoenix FC seasons
Wellington Phoenix Season, 2008-09
Wellington Phoenix season